KNTE (101.7 MHz) is a commercial FM radio station licensed to Bay City, Texas.  The station broadcasts a radio format The studios of Regional Mexican music, simulcast with sister station 98.5 KTJM Port Arthur, and is owned by Estrella Radio License of Houston LLC, a subsidiary of Estrella Media.

History
The station began broadcasting on September 25, 1995, holding the call sign KXGJ and airing a country music format branded "Pure Country". In 2002, Liberman Broadcasting purchased the station, along with 96.9 KIOX-FM in El Campo, Texas, for $3.15 million. The station began airing a tropical music format. Its ERP was later increased to 35 kilowatts, and it began targeting SW Houston and Fort Bend County. On April 3, 2012, the station's call sign was changed to KNTE. On July 11, 2014, KNTE changed its format to regional Mexican, branded as "La Ranchera 101.7".

On December 14, 2020, sister station 103.3 KJOJ-FM in Freeport, Texas suffered catastrophic failure, resulting in that facility going silent. KNTE was then changed from simulcasting Houston station 850 KEYH "La Ranchera" to simulcasting 98.5 KTJM, in order to replace most of KJOJ-FM's over the air coverage area.

References

External links
KNTE's official website

NTE
Estrella Media stations
Radio stations established in 1995
1995 establishments in Texas
Regional Mexican radio stations in the United States